Pedro de la Torre (died 1573) was a Roman Catholic prelate who served as Bishop of Paraguay (1554–1573).

Biography
Pedro de la Torre was ordained a priest in the Order of Friars Minor. 
On 27 August 1554, he was appointed during the papacy of Pope Julius III as Bishop of Paraguay. 
He served as Bishop of Paraguay until his death in 1573.

References

External links and additional sources
 (for Chronology of Bishops) 
 (for Chronology of Bishops)  

1573 deaths
Bishops appointed by Pope Julius III
Franciscan bishops
16th-century Roman Catholic bishops in Paraguay
Roman Catholic bishops of Paraguay